Frank Penn may refer to:

Frank Penn (cricketer, born 1851) (1851–1916), English cricketer
Frank Penn (cricketer, born 1884) (1884–1961), English cricketer
Frank Penn (footballer), English footballer, fl. 1910–1940